Phlyctidocarpa is a genus of flowering plants belonging to the family Apiaceae. It contains a single species, Phlyctidocarpa flava. Its native range is Namibia.

Taxonomy
The genus and sole species were first described in 1967. It has been placed in subfamily Apioideae (possibly in its own tribe Phlyctidocarpeae), but a 2021 molecular phylogenetic study found that it was sister to a clade composed of the subfamilies Saniculoideae and Apioideae so that including it in Apioideae rendered that subfamily paraphyletic. One possibility is to include it in an expanded Saniculoideae; another is to merge Saniculoideae into an expanded Apioideae.

References

Apiaceae
Monotypic Apiaceae genera